Bessie Olive Cole (1883–1971) was an American pharmacist, called "The first lady of Pharmacy in Maryland".

Biography 
She was born in Mount Carmel, Baltimore County on November 14, 1883, daughter of Jordan B. Cole and Nancy Ellen Wheeler. In Reisterstown she graduated from Franklin High School. Spending one year at Baltimore Business College, Cole graduated in 1903. She first began by working for Merck & Co. as a stenographer. She subsequently left Merck to attend the University of Maryland School of Pharmacy, receiving a Doctor of Pharmacy in 1913, and graduating with the highest grade in her class.

Three years after graduating, she received a job working at the Solway-Annan Company, and working part-time at the War Risk Department in Washington, which she would hold for four years. Following her departure from her public work, she was employed at the University of Maryland School of Pharmacy as Secretary of the faculty, until retiring in 1953. The same year she was hired by the University of Maryland, she also enrolled in the University of Maryland School of Law, becoming the first female to receive a degree from that school. Though she never used it, she was a licensed attorney for many years. Additionally, from 1948 to 1949, Cole was dean of the School of Pharmacy. Throughout her life, she studied (at various times) English,  history, and economics at Johns Hopkins University.

She was a member of Maryland Pharmacists Association, the American Pharmaceutical Association and the Epsilon chapter of Lambda Kappa Sigma pharmacy sorority. She served as President of the Baltimore Branch of the American Pharmaceutical Association. The B. Olive Cole Pharmacy Museum was founded in her memory. She died on June 5, 1971.

References 

1883 births
1971 deaths
American pharmacists
People from Baltimore County, Maryland
University of Maryland, Baltimore alumni
Women pharmacists
Place of death missing
University of Maryland Francis King Carey School of Law alumni
Maryland lawyers
20th-century American women lawyers
20th-century American lawyers